The 2003 Czech Indoor Open Open was a men's tennis tournament played on indoor hard courts in Průhonice, Czech Republic, and was part of the 2003 ATP Challenger Series.

It was the first edition of the tournament and was held from 17 to 23 November 2003.

Marc Rosset won in the final 7–6(7–4), 6(1–7)–7, 7–6(7–3), against Dick Norman.

Seeds

Draw

Finals

Top half

Bottom half

References 
Main Draw

Main Draw on ITF Site

2003 Singles